{{DISPLAYTITLE:C12H20N2}}
The molecular formula C12H20N2 (molar mass: 192.30 g/mol, exact mass: 192.1626 u) may refer to:

 Amiflamine (FLA-336)
 Tremorine